Shri Ganesh Rai Post Graduate College (SGRPGC) was set up in 1939 by Late Shri Mathura Singh, Late Shri Bhagwati Singh and many other notable Raghuvanshi personalities of Dobhi, Jaunpur, U.P., India. It is one of the constituent Colleges of the Veer Bahadur Singh Purvanchal University, U. P., India. Before all else, the College provided food essentially to the requirements of the individuals who were in livelihood however who had a craving to upgrade their instructive capabilities and accomplish higher norms of learning. Shri Ganesh Rai P.G. College epitomized the soul of social duty and social mindfulness mirroring the yearnings of the students.

SGRPGC anticipate the 21st century as a test and a chance to assemble our college as a vehicle for progress and development to get ready students think basically and act capably in a quickly changing worldwide environment.

SGRPGC has a portion of the best workforce to guide students in their quest for learning. The College is outfitted with remarkable research facilities and teaching helps, other than normal assets like the focal library, flasks, and in offices. Every division additionally has its own particular labs, libraries, and even exhibition hall.

References

VBSPU Results Updates
VBSPU Time table Updates

Universities and colleges in Jaunpur, Uttar Pradesh